FIBA Women's World League was an annual women's basketball competition organised by FIBA from 2003 to 2007.

2006-07
Preliminary Round:

Group A (Shaoxing, China)

Group B (Pecs, Hungary)

Final Tournament (Ekaterinburg, Russia)

CSKA Moscow beat Team USA in the final game 75-65.

2005
The event was again held in Samara, Russia. 

Participants:

VBM-SGAU successfully accomplished a three-peat.

2004
Preliminary Round:

Group A (Taipei, Taiwan)

Group B (Sao Paulo, Brazil)

Final Tournament (St. Petersburg, Russia)

VBM-SGAU beat Lotus VBW 83-67 in the final to retain the World Title.

2003
The event was held in Samara, Russia. 

Participants:

Behind Maria Stepanova's 17 points and 16 rebounds, host VBM-SGAU edged WNBA Select 72-68 in the final.

References

Women's basketball leagues
Women's World League
2003 in women's basketball
2004 in women's basketball
2005 in women's basketball
2006 in women's basketball
2007 in women's basketball